Wanshengxi station is a subway station on the Line 7 of the Beijing Subway.

History 
The station was formerly called Wanshengnanjiexikou station. In May 2019, the Beijing Municipal Commission of Planning and Natural Resources  proposed a naming plan for the stations of the eastern extension of Line 7, and they planned to name it Dagao station. On November 20, 2019, the station was officially named Wansheng Xi (West) station. The station opened on December 28, 2019.

Station Layout 
The station has an underground island platform.

Exits 
There are 3 exits, lettered B, C2, and D. Exits B and D are accessible.

References

Beijing Subway stations in Tongzhou District
Railway stations in China opened in 2019